Widar Bagge (30 April 1886 – 18 April 1970) was a Swedish diplomat.

Career
Bagge was born in Fuxerna, Lilla Edet Municipality, Sweden, the son of wholesaler John Bagge and his wife Fredrika (née Corin). He received a Candidate of Law degree in Stockholm in 1914 and was a temporary officer at the National Board of Trade in 1918 before becoming an attaché at the Ministry for Foreign Affairs in 1919. Bagge then served as an administrative officer in 1920, second legation secretary in London in 1921 and acting chargé d'affaires in Brussels in 1922. He was first legation secretary in Rome in 1923, in Helsinki in 1924 and in Tokyo in 1928. Bagge was the acting consul general in Shanghai in 1930, director at the Foreign Ministry in 1931, charges d'Affaires in Warsaw in 1934, and legation counsellor in Paris in 1934. Bagge was then envoy in Tokyo and Bangkok from 1937 to 1945.

While in Tokyo, Bagge was attended by foreign minister Mamoru Shigemitsu, who wanted Bagge to convey a peace overture to the United States. Bagge cabled a surrender offer to the Swedish foreign office, for transmittal to the United Kingdom, which relayed it to the United States. Japan was prepared to relinquish all the territory it took in the war and Manchukuo, which it had seized in 1931. Bagge emphasized that the offer must be considered a serious one. The offer, however, came to nothing.

He was envoy in Cairo and Addis Ababa from 1945 to 1951, including in Damascus and Beirut from 1947. In Cairo, he fell in love with Yolande Harmer, a successful Israeli spy. Before she was arrested in July 1948, she had succeeded in changing Bagge's views on Zionism. The assassination of Folke Bernadotte in September 1948, however, made his enthusiasm to cool again.

Death
Bagge died on 18 April 1970 and was buried on 11 May 1970 at Norra begravningsplatsen in Solna Municipality.

Awards and decorations
Bagge's awards:

   King Gustaf V's Jubilee Commemorative Medal (1928)
   Commander Grand Cross of the Order of the Polar Star (6 June 1951)
Grand Cross of the Order of Leopold II
Grand Cross of the Order of the Nile
Grand Cross of the Order of the Lion of Finland
Grand Cross of the Order of the Phoenix
Grand Cross of the Order of Orange-Nassau
Grand Cross of the Order of St. Olav
Grand Cross of the Order of the Crown of Thailand
Grand Cross of the Order of Merit of the Republic of Hungary
Grand Officer of the Order of the Condor of the Andes
Commander of the Order of the White Rose of Finland
Commander of the Legion of Honour
Commander of the Order of the Crown of Italy
Commander of the Order of Christ
Commander of the Decoration of Honour for Services to the Republic of Austria
First Class of the Order of the Sacred Treasure

References

Further reading

1886 births
1970 deaths
Consuls-general of Sweden
Ambassadors of Sweden to Japan
Ambassadors of Sweden to Thailand
Ambassadors of Sweden to Egypt
Ambassadors of Sweden to Ethiopia
Ambassadors of Sweden to Syria
Ambassadors of Sweden to Lebanon
People from Lilla Edet Municipality
Burials at Norra begravningsplatsen
Commanders Grand Cross of the Order of the Polar Star